Wolfgang Giegerich (born 1942) is a German psychologist, trained as a Jungian analyst.  He was a practicing clinician for many years and has published books and articles on depth psychology since the mid-1970s.

Biography
Wolfgang Giegerich was born in Wiesbaden, Hesse. He studied at the University of Würzburg and the University of Göttingen, and obtained his Ph.D. from the University of California at Berkeley. He received a Diploma from the C. G. Jung Institute–Stuttgart. After many years in private practice in Stuttgart and later in Wörthsee, near Munich, he now lives in Berlin. He has been a regular speaker at the Eranos conferences, and repeatedly taught as visiting professor at Kyoto University, Kyoto, Japan. He was on the faculty at Rutgers University from 1969 to 1972. He has lectured and taught in many countries (Germany, Switzerland, Austria, England, Italy, the US, Russia, Japan, and Brazil) and before many professional societies. His approximately 200 publications in the field of psychology, in several languages, include fourteen books. As a training analyst and supervisor, he currently writes, teaches, and works on publishing his collected English papers in psychology.

Redefining psychology
The major goal of this approach is to redefine the notion of psychology (the logos of the soul) as it has emerged as a discipline in Western thought.  Giegerich's perspective is influenced by the traditional depth psychologies of Sigmund Freud and Carl Jung, and more recently James Hillman’s archetypal psychology.  Unlike both Sigmund Freud and Carl Jung, Giegerich argues that the methodology of the empirical sciences is an inadequate basis for the study of psychology.  Rather, he draws on the phenomenology of Martin Heidegger, the notion of the dialectical movement of consciousness from G. W. F. Hegel, and like Jung, he uses various transformational ideas from medieval alchemy.  Additionally, in contrast to modern academic psychology and to the various schools of psychotherapy, Giegerich argues for a shift in focus from the individual, whose very definition has changed radically throughout history, to a focus on the cultural mind, evolving zeitgeist, or as he prefers, “the soul,” which is what ultimately gives rise to the changing understandings of what it means to be an ‘individual’.  It is this movement of soul or a culture's mode of being-in-the-world, which when viewed within a historical context, is the primary interest.

Accordingly, in Giegerich's theory, the idea of soul does not function as some kind of objective or empirical substrate producing psychological phenomena.  Rather it is the logical structure of thought as which any phenomena, viewed psychologically, exist.  As Giegerich states, “There is no such thing as a soul that produces psychological phenomena.  The phenomena have nothing behind them.  They have everything they need within themselves, even their own origin, their author or subject.  ‘The soul’ in my parlance thus does not refer to something real outside of, distinct from, and in addition to psychological phenomenology, but is no more than a still mythologizing, personifying, façon de parler, an expression for the inner soul quality, depth, and internal infinity, of the phenomena themselves as well as for their internal ‘teleology’.”.

Psychology as the discipline of interiority
Giegerich defines psychology as the discipline of interiority.  Interiority, in this sense, refers to the ‘interior’ of the phenomena themselves.  This should not to be confused with the interiority or subjectivity of the mind, though of course, the mind is where psychological phenomena inevitably make their appearance.

The interiority of the phenomenon is pursued though various interpretive strategies and a general attitude which allows the phenomenon to “speak for itself.”  Theoretical biases and preconceptions as well as motivations that arise from self-interests, other than a simple desire for understanding and insight, are to be avoided.  The desired outcome is the emergence in thought, and eventual articulation, of the logical structure or concrete concept as which the phenomena ultimately become intelligible.

In this approach, there is no privileged content such as, for example, when Freud called dreams "the royal road to the unconscious" or as is common in Jungian psychology to privilege dreams, myths, fairy tales, and various other subjective phenomena.  The only stipulation is that whatever the phenomenon under consideration is, that it be regarded from a psychological point of view, that is, as an expression of the soul, and that there is a "pressing urge for us to come to a binding commitment concerning its truth.”  What is an expression of the soul?  Anything of cultural significance—art, science, politics, social and political phenomena—in other words, any place that thought and mind have made an appearance.  The interiority that is spoken of is the essential logical structure of such phenomena.

Depth psychology and the unconscious
Giegerich places his approach within the tradition of depth psychology, but diverges significantly from both Freud and Jung.  In Freudian psychology, the notion of depth implies the involvement of the unconscious in the form of hidden motivations or psychodynamics.  In Jungian psychology depth generally refers to the archetypal images of the collective unconscious.  Giegerich is generally disinclined to use the notion of the unconscious as he argues that it has become reified as an empirically objective entity that functions as a positivistic substrate for psychological phenomena, and for a true psychology, any reduction to positivistic levels of explanation is an abandonment of the basic psychological stance.  He is critical of Jung for theoretically locating archetypes within the ‘collective unconscious’ since such a move effectively removes the notion of archetypes (which Jung posited as unknowable in themselves) from the arena of what can be subjected to critical evaluation, and instead gives them the status of a “mystification.”   The term “unconscious,” when it is used by Giegerich, is an adjective likely to simply mean not conscious, rather than referring to some sort of ‘container’ of repressed or unknown psychological material or a special ‘place’ within the mind.

The objective psyche and the soul
A key idea in this approach is the notion of the “objective psyche,” a term associated with Jung.  Giegerich prefers the term soul, which means roughly the same thing.  His preference for the word “soul” results from his seeing the term as carrying many of the subtle meanings and connotations from within the historical development of Western philosophy and psychology.  Basically, this notion of the soul refers to the collective categories and structures of thought available to a particular culture at a particular time in history, and as such, it is the subject of psychology, in contrast to “personalistic psychology,” which is focused on the psychology that individual people have.  As Giegerich says, “For a true psychology, only the soul, which is certainly undemonstrable, merely ‘metaphorical’ and for this reason a seeming nothing, can be the ‘substrate’ and subject of the phenomena.  The human being is then their object; he or she is nothing but the place where soul shows itself, just like the world is the place where man shows himself and becomes active.  We therefore must shift our standpoint away from ‘the human person’ to the ‘soul.’ ... I am talking of a shift of our standpoint, perspective, or the idea in terms of which we study, just as before, the concrete experience of individuals or peoples.”   And it must be kept in mind that ultimately, it is the soul that frames the horizon for the “concrete experience of individuals or peoples.”

Methodology
In order to appreciate the present expressions of soul, a cultural and historical perspective is basic.  Since psychology is primarily a Western phenomenon, it requires an understanding of history, particularly Western intellectual history as well as a familiarity with current trends in world culture.  Within a mind so constituted, the phenomenon is given its independence, unencumbered as much as possible by the personalistic concerns for adjustment, development, emotional stability, etc. typically characteristic of modern psychology and of individual consumers of pop psychology.  As Giegerich says, “To do psychology, you have to have abstracted from your own thinking, to become able to dispassionately hear what the phenomena are saying and to let the thoughts as which they exist think themselves out, no matter where they will take you and without your butting in with your personal valuations and interests.”  The corresponding attitude is one of receptivity rather than egoic agency, a fact which for many people has a resonance with Buddhist thinking.

The idea of ‘thoughts thinking themselves’ is understood in terms of a Hegelian dialectic.  Whether one starts with a dream, a symptom, or a cultural production, the phenomenon is allowed to present itself to consciousness, and it often does so through a series of positions and negations.  Through iterations of this “dialectical analysis”  the phenomenon, whatever it is, is revealed in its depth.  Another way of saying it is that the phenomenon is hermeneutically “interiorized into itself,” through an examination of multiple layers of positions, negations and re-established positions.  It is this kind of an analysis, in which thought penetrates ever more deeply into the logical structure of the matter at hand, which is why psychology is defined as the “discipline of interiority.”

Changing modes of being-in-the-world
Much of Giegerich's analysis of modern cultural phenomena such as the World Wide Web, the nuclear bomb, and television occur against the backdrop of what he sees as major shifts in consciousness.  These shifts occur when the dominant logical form of thought changes.

Giegerich describes broad historical manifestations in the soul's mode of being-in-the-world that are dominant at a particular time in history.  These include the shamanistic, the mythic-ritualistic, the religious-metaphysical and the scientific-technological modes of being-in-the-world.  The latter characterizes the modern world.  Obviously, while these different styles of consciousness may co-exist to some extent each has had a time of ascendency.  Each was characteristic of the way people thought about life and the world at that particular historical-cultural nexus.

One of the most profound changes in this regard has occurred along a dimension of immediacy vs. reflected thought—a movement from a consciousness that is identified with the immediacy of its imagistic experiences of the natural world,  to a consciousness that can hold the natural world conceptually, vis-à-vis itself, as an object of abstract thought.  This change underlies both a fundamental change in human beings’ relation to nature as well as marking a milestone in the cultural achievement of an expanded psychological consciousness.

The ego and the goal of psychology
For Giegerich, psychology has no proper goal other than understanding and insight.  Any approach motivated by practical concerns, such as those relating to personal development or even creating a better world, though of undeniable concern to human beings, are regarded as lying outside the true discipline of psychology which is concerned only with the ways that the structure of thought have and continue to evolve through history, in other words, with the logical movement of the soul.  This is not to deny the importance of human concerns but rather places them outside the discipline of psychology, perhaps more properly in an anthropological framework.

Psychotherapy
The soul appears in clinical practice in the autonomous form of “the third person of psychotherapy.”  As Giegerich says, “[the soul] is no longer to be imagined as the individual property of each of the two other persons [in the consulting room, analyst and patient], but must be given independent reality.  It is the world of complexes and archetypal images, of views and styles of consciousness, and thus it is also psychology itself, in the widest sense of the word, including all our ideas about the soul, its pathology and therapy, as well as our Weltanschauung.”   A similar view is expressed by Jungian analyst Greg Mogenson talking about the soul in psychotherapy, “When, however, the psychological difference is recognized, and the ideas and feelings, situation, images, and dreams are allowed to have their say, the patient may come to know his own particular version of that ego-sublating discourse with the other that St. Paul described when he said that it was not he who lived and spoke, but his interior other, the savior within him.”   Through serving the soul, that is, by the therapist seriously receiving the patient's situation as a manifestation of soul, the patient receives his or her due. Giegerich's theoretical premises have no account of clinical efficacy for mental health purposes in psychoanalytic practice, beyond philosophic thought.

Criticism
James Hillman, among the most accomplished and prolific post-Jungian writers remarked on (some of) the work Giegerich was engaged in prior to 1994: “Wolfgang Giegerich’s thought is the most important Jungian thought now going on—maybe the only consistent Jungian thought at all.” Hillman however qualified such praise by claiming that Giegerich's writings are also "vitiated with fallacies" of which Hillman elaborated three; 'the fallacy of historical models'; 'the ontological fallacy' and 'the fallacy of concretism'. Giegerich's work has also been controversial within the Jungian community, where the criticisms generally have been that his focus is too much on the intellect, that his writing style is unnecessarily opaque, and that it is difficult to relate his theory to the practice of psychotherapy. There is no documentation delineating the psychoanalytic efficacy of Giegerich's philosophical views in light of phenomena presenting for the clinical practice of psychology.

Giegerich is criticised as dismissive of the role of emotion plays in generating interest in logical process, thinking and doctrine, and also for conflating "emotion" or "affect" with Jung's definition of "feelings" whilst summarily dismissing all three from any consideration of their influence in the dialectical process. Whilst Giegerich appeals to Jung's definition of feeling as an "ego function" that negatively interferes with objective thought, he fails to elaborate on the role of physiological affect which, by contrast to Jung's feeling-function, is not an ego function and which nevertheless accompanies the human organism at all times in the form of moods that shape perceptions and influence logic in a way that cannot be simply dismissed as Giegerich recommends. Critics have stated that Giegerich's recommendations to "rise above" or to "be free of" emotions amount to the promotion of lack of emotional awareness and outright disaffectation in Joyce McDougall's sense of the term. He has responded to a few of these criticisms in his writings, but not all.

Partial bibliography
Giegerich, Wolfgang. The Soul’s Logical Life. Frankfurt am Main: Peter Lang, 2001.
Giegerich, Wolfgang. “The End of Meaning and the Birth of Man,” Journal of Jungian Theory and Practice 6(1), 2004, 1-66. (This article is available on the Web.  See the external links below.)
Giegerich, Wolfgang. The Collected English Papers, Vol. 1: The Neurosis of Psychology: Primary Papers toward a Critical Psychology. New Orleans, Spring Journal Books, 2005.
Giegerich, Wolfgang, David L. Miller, & Greg Mogenson. Dialectics and Analytical Psychology: The El Capitan Canyon Seminar. New Orleans: Spring Journal Books. 2005.
Giegerich, Wolfgang. The Collected English Papers, Vol. 2: Technology and the Soul: From the Nuclear bomb to the World Wide Web. New Orleans: Spring Journal Books, 2007.
Giegerich, Wolfgang. The Collected English Papers, Vol. 3: Soul-Violence, Spring Journal Books, New Orleans: 2008.
Giegerich, Wolfgang. The Collected English Papers, Vol. 4: The Soul Always Thinks,  New Orleans: Spring Journal Books, 2010.
Giegerich, Wolfgang. “Love the Questions Themselves,” an interview with Robert Henderson in Living with Jung: “Enterviews” with Jungian Analysts, Vol. 3, (Robert & Janis Henderson, eds.) Spring Journal Books, New Orleans: 2010.
Giegerich, Wolfgang. What is Soul?, New Orleans: Spring Journal Books, 2012.
Giegerich, Wolfgang. The Collected English Papers, Vol. 5: The Flight into the Unconscious: An analysis of C.G. Jung's psychology project, New Orleans: Spring Journal Books, 2013.
Giegerich, Wolfgang. The Collected English Papers, Vol. 6: Dreaming the Myth Onwards: C.G. Jung on Christianity and on Hegel. Part 2 of The Flight into the Unconscious, New Orleans: Spring Journal Books, 2014.
Giegerich, Wolfgang. Neurosis: The Logic of a Metaphysical Illness, New Orleans: Spring Journal Books, 2013.

References

External links
The End of Meaning and the Birth of Man
The International Society for Psychology as the Discipline of Interiority

1942 births
Living people
German psychologists
Jungian psychologists